Hypochaeris oligocephala is a species of flowering plant in the family Asteraceae native to the Canary Islands.

References

External links
Flora vascular de Canarias, Hypochaeris oligocephala (Svent. & Bramwell) Lack in Spanish with photos
 GBIF entry
Hypochaeris Using Internal Transcribed Spacers of Nuclear rDNA: Inference for Chromosomal Evolution", Mol. Biol. Evol. 15(3):345–354. 1998.
 M Cerbah, J Coulaud, Sc Brown, and S Siljak-yakovlev, "Evolutionary DNA variation in the genus Hypochaeris", Heredity (1999) 82, 261–266.

oligocephala
Flora of the Canary Islands
Plants described in 1971